Holly Hynes is an accomplished, award winning costume designer with over 250 ballets to her credit, including more than 70 at the New York City Ballet. Hynes' designs are also on view in companies around the world, including American Ballet Theatre, San Francisco Ballet, Bolshoi Ballet, National Ballet of Canada, Kirov Ballet, Royal Ballet, Paris Opera Ballet, Royal Danish Ballet, La Scala Theatre Ballet, Koninklijk Ballet van Vlaanderen, Houston Ballet, BalletMet,  Pennsylvania Ballet,  Ballet Vancouver, Les Grands Ballets Canadiens, American Repertory Ballet, Pacific Northwest Ballet, Atlanta Ballet, Richmond Ballet, Nashville Ballet, Miami City Ballet, Alberta Ballet, Joffrey Ballet, Kansas City Ballet , and the Suzanne Farrell Ballet at The John F. Kennedy Center for the Performing Arts, where she served as the resident costume designer for 19 years.

Ballet design consultant 

For 21 years, Hynes served as the Director of Costumes for New York City Ballet. Recognized as a leading authority in the accurate reproduction of important original ballet works, including those of George Balanchine and Jerome Robbins, Hynes has assisted many major companies, both in the United States and abroad, including the Royal Danish Ballet in Copenhagen, Denmark; Ballet de l'Opéra National de Paris, France; Théâtre du Capitole, Toulouse, France; The Bavarian State Ballet, Munich, Germany; The Cincinnati Ballet, Ohio; San Francisco Ballet, California; The Birmingham Royal Ballet, Birmingham, England; The Royal Ballet, London, England; Miami City Ballet, Florida; La Scala Theatre Ballet, Milan, Italy; Dutch National Ballet, Amsterdam; Hamburg Ballet, Germany;  Staatsballett Berlin, Germany; and the Mariinsky Ballet, Saint Petersburg, Russia.

Theatrical design and opera 

Hynes' theatrical designs include two Broadway productions at Circle in the Square Theatre: On Borrowed Time," directed by George C. Scott, and George Bernard Shaw's Getting Married," as well as a dozen plays and musicals at the off-Broadway York Theatre. Her opera designs include La Gioconda and the Metropolitan Opera in New York, including Christopher Wheeldon's "Dance of the Hours"; and The Music Master, Gerard Schwarz, conducting. She has designed several productions for Theater for Young Audiences, based at The John F. Kennedy Center, including the national tour of Quiara Alegria Hudes' Barrio Grrrl!

Art work and publications 

Her designs for Ulysses Dove's Red Angels at New York City Ballet, George Balanchine's Divertimento No. 15 for Suzanne Farrell Ballet at the Kennedy Center and Kaleidoscope for Peter Quanz at American Ballet Theater were featured on covers of Dance Magazine.

Four of her costume renderings remain as part of the permanent collection of the Theatre Wing of the Museum of the City of New York. She has exhibited renderings and watercolors in two gallery shows at Avery Fisher Hall at Lincoln Center for the Performing Arts and has had six of her costumes featured on covers of the 1994-95 New York State Theater Playbills, also at Lincoln Center. Hynes' designs for six miniature ballerina dolls were featured in the 1996 Christmas decorations at the White House and will remain in the permanent collection of the President William Jefferson Clinton Library in Little Rock, Arkansas. In 1997, she was honored with a one-woman show of her costumes, sketches, and photographs at the Marvin Cone Galleries, at Coe College, her alma mater, located in Cedar Rapids, Iowa. From 2008 to 2009, three of her costumes for dance were featured in "CURTAIN CALL: Celebrating a Century of Women Designing for Live Performance," an exhibition shown at the Lincoln Center Library for the Performing Arts, New York, NY.

Lectures / appearances 

Ms. Hynes was one of four behind-the-scenes ballet artists selected to be featured in "Beyond the Stage Door" an interactive exhibition presented by the Philadelphia Ballet. Premiering on April 29, 2022, at the Cherry Street Pier, an animator create a video stage door describing Ms. Hynes's process of designing ballet costumes through animated watercolor-infused pencil drawings.

In May 2007, her thoughts on designing for the ballet were archived in a video titled, "Speaking of Dancing" for the Jerome Robbins dance division of the New York Public Library for the Performing Arts in New York City. In fall of 2010, Hynes was invited with another colleague to give a presentation entitled, "See the Music - Hear the Dance" in Florence, Italy, at the Second Costume Colloquium celebrating dress for dance. In 2017, Hynes was featured in the podcast presented by former 1010 WINS anchor and personality. The podcast series Sandi Klein's Conversations with Creative Women  features a 23-minute conversation with Hynes.

Awards 

Hynes received the 2018 Theater Development Fund/Irene Sharaff Lifetime Achievement Award at the Edison Ballroom in New York City, on April 20, 2018. Prima Ballerina Wendy Whelan presented Hynes with the honor. Whelan remarked, "She always designs masterfully for each project as a whole, but it's of equal importance to her that she design to honor and empower the performers themselves. The distinct love-letter nature of Holly's work allows the essence of the dancer to live on forever...For this, we are forever grateful to you Holly. You are truly a dancer's designer." In accepting the award, after thanking the many choreographers, makers, technicians, and assistants with whom she has worked over the years, Hynes emphasized the importance of mentoring. She said, "I can't stress enough the importance of mentoring and the importance of sharing your knowledge. Don't hold it in. Don't be afraid somebody is going to steal your idea. We have to share everything we know because the next generation is going to keep us alive in what they do."

Personal life 

Hynes is originally from Des Moines, Iowa and attended Coe College. She lives in New Jersey with her husband, Jim Zulakis, their son Christopher Zulakis, a cartoonist. They have a turtle named "Scardey." Their daughter, Katina Zulakis lives in Queens, NY, and works as a professional graphic designer and artist.

References

External links
 www.hollyhynes.com
 New York Times reviews
 Village Voice reviews
 Dance Universe (article) - Holly Hynes: Director of Costumes, New York City Ballet
 Bio: The Suzanne Farrell Ballet
 
 2018 TDF/Irene Sharaff Awards celebrate designers from the world of dance

Ballet designers
Living people
 Holly Hynes
Year of birth missing (living people)